A leadership election for ANO 2011 was held on 1 August 2012. Andrej Babiš was elected the first leader of the party. Babiš receive 73 votes of 76 delegates.

References

ANO 2011 leadership elections
ANO 2011 leadership election
ANO 2011 leadership election
Single-candidate elections
Indirect elections
Elections in Prague
ANO 2011 leadership election
ANO 2011 leadership election